American singer Julia Michaels has released one studio album, five EPs, twenty-six singles (including ten as a featured artist), one promotional single, and twenty music videos. Her songwriting credits include 20 hits on the Billboard Hot 100, of which twelve have reached the top 40.

Studio albums

Extended plays

Singles

As lead artist

As featured artist

Promotional singles

Other charted songs

Guest appearances

Music videos

Songwriting credits
 indicates a background vocal contribution.

 indicates an un-credited lead vocal contribution.

 indicates a credited vocal/featured artist contribution.

Notes

References

Discographies of American artists
Pop music discographies